Rafael Ylönen (26 November 1906 – 31 March 1997) was a Finnish gymnast. He competed in seven events at the 1928 Summer Olympics.

References

External links
 

1906 births
1997 deaths
Finnish male artistic gymnasts
Olympic gymnasts of Finland
Gymnasts at the 1928 Summer Olympics
People from Lappeenranta
Sportspeople from South Karelia
20th-century Finnish people